The Union of Evangelical Baptists of Spain is a Baptist Christian denomination in Spain. It is affiliated with the Federation of Evangelical Religious Entities of Spain and the Baptist World Alliance. The headquarters is in Madrid.

History
The Union has its origins in the establishment of the first church
Baptist in Madrid by William J. Knapp in 1870.  In the 1920s, several Baptist churches were also founded by an American mission of the International Mission Board.  In 1922, the Baptist Theological Institute (now Faculty of Theology of the Evangelical Baptist Union of Spain) was inaugurated in Barcelona.  In 1923, the Union is officially founded. In 1928, the first convention took place. In 2004, the Union had 91 churches. According to a denomination census released in 2020, it claimed 101 churches and 11,284 members.

See also 
 Protestantism in Spain
 Anglicanism in Spain
 Evangelical Presbyterian Church in Spain
 Reformed Churches in Spain
 Spanish Evangelical Church
 Spanish Evangelical Lutheran Church

References

External links
Official Website 	

Baptist denominations in Europe
Baptist denominations established in the 20th century
Christian organizations established in 1929
Baptist Christianity in Spain